Novofyodorovskoye is a rural locality (a village) and the administrative centre of Ashkadarsky Selsoviet, Sterlitamaksky District, Bashkortostan, Russia. The population was 328 as of 2010. There are 3 streets.

Geography 
Novofyodorovskoye is located 33 km southwest of Sterlitamak (the district's administrative centre) by road. Grigoryevka is the nearest rural locality.

References 

Rural localities in Sterlitamaksky District